Noel Webb may refer to:

 Noel Webb (musician), American jazz violinist, composer and actor
 Noel Webb (RFC officer) (1896–1917), British World War I flying ace